Marie-Luise Gothein (12 September 1863 – 24 December 1931) was a Prussian scholar, gardener and author. 

Gothein was born Marie Luise Schröder in Passenheim, East Prussia. She wrote the monumental History of Garden Art, regarded as a standard work. It was published in German in 1913 and English in 1928. It is said to be the "best and most comprehensive" history of the world's gardens. In 1885, she married Eberhard Gothein. After the deaths of her husband and her sons in the First World War, Gothein traveled east and wrote a book on Indian gardens.

She was quoted as saying "The journey through the history of the garden is to walk through the garden of history. People, nations, generations, we are learning in their intimate, domestic habits, their scientific interests, their living and thinking, its solemnity, its decoration."

She died in Heidelberg.

Publications
History of Garden Art. Volume 1: From Egypt to the Renaissance in Italy, Spain and Portugal. Volume 2: From the Renaissance to the present day in France. Published with the support of the Royal Academy of Construction in Berlin. Diederichs, 1914 
 945 pages Publisher: Hacker Art Books; Facsimile edition (June 1972) ; .
Maria Effinger, Karin Seeber (Hrsg.):"Es ist schon eine wunderbare Zeit, die ich jetzt lebe": Die Heidelberger Gelehrte Marie Luise Gothein (1863-1931). Eine Ausstellung der Universitätsbibliothek Heidelberg, Winter, Heidelberg 2014,  (German)

Notes

External links

Marie Luise Gothein quotes
 'Es ist schon eine wunderbare Zeit, die ich jetzt lebe'. Die Heidelberger Gelehrte Marie Luise Gothein online exhibition (German) 

German garden writers
1863 births
1931 deaths
People from Szczytno County
People from East Prussia